Saint-Genis-du-Bois (Gascon: Sent Genís deu Bòsc or Sent Genís dau Bòsc) is a commune in the Gironde department in Nouvelle-Aquitaine in southwestern France.

Population

See also
Communes of the Gironde department

References

Communes of Gironde